Events from the year 1952 in North Korea.

Incumbents
Premier: Kim Il-sung 
Supreme Leader: Kim Il-sung

Events

 Battle of Triangle Hill.

See also

Years in Japan
Years in South Korea

References

 
North Korea
1950s in North Korea
Years of the 20th century in North Korea
North Korea